"Sex Talk" is a song by British band T'Pau, written by Carol Decker and Ron Rogers, and produced by Roy Thomas Baker. It was originally released as a single in 1987 under the title "Intimate Strangers", but failed to chart. It was re-titled "Sex Talk" and included on the band's debut studio album Bridge of Spies (1987). In 1988, a live version of the song, recorded at the SEC Centre on 29 October 1987, was released as a single and reached No. 23 on the UK Singles Chart.

Speaking to eonmusic in 2018, Decker recalled of the song: "I wrote that on my first trip to New York. There were all [these] ads; "Dial Me!" on television, and I just thought; "Wow, that's weird, phone people up and talk dirty"... so I did it, of course!"

Reception
Upon release of the 1988 single, Music & Media wrote: "Another dramatic, pumping, rock track, that has all the chances to hit the charts again." Betty Page of Record Mirror wrote: "T'Pau show their true colours and get down to a full-blooded slice of raunch 'n' roll recorded live, with plenty of guitar drama and Carol Decker giving it her all. It's brave of them to release a live 45, but it does capture the T'Pau live vibe well." In a review of T'Pau (Bridge of Spies), Pete Bishop of The Pittsburgh Press commented: "There's "Sex Talk", which has fake horns and real guitar and would do credit to the Eurythmics, although Miss Decker, a less adenoidal Cyndi Lauper with little body to her strident voice, is no Annie Lennox."

Track listing

Intimate Strangers
7" single
"Intimate Strangers" - 4:12
"No Sense of Pride" - 3:52

12" single
"Intimate Strangers" - 4:12
"No Sense of Pride" - 3:52
"You Give Up" (Live) - 3:58

Sex Talk (Live)
7" single (1988 release)
"Sex Talk" (Live) - 3:54
"Monkey House" (Live) - 4:13

12" single (1988 release)
"Sex Talk" (Live) - 4:34
"Monkey House" (Live) - 4:13
"You Give Up" (Live) - 3:59

CD single (1988 release)
"Sex Talk" (Live) - 4:43
"Heart & Soul" - 5:19
"Monkey House" (Live) - 4:28
"You Give Up" (Live) - 4:10

Personnel
T'Pau
 Carol Decker – lead vocals
 Dean Howard – lead guitar
 Ronnie Rogers – rhythm guitar
 Michael Chetwood – keyboards
 Paul Jackson – bass
 Tim Burgess – drums

Production
 Roy Thomas Baker - producer of "I Will Be with You"
 T'Pau - producers of "No Sense of Pride"
 Norman Goodman - engineer on "No Sense of Pride", mixing on live tracks

Other
 Mark Millington - sleeve design (1987 and 1988 releases)
 Zoe Wilson - front cover photography
 Mauro Carraro - back cover photography

Charts

References

1987 songs
1987 singles
1988 singles
T'Pau (band) songs
Songs written by Carol Decker
Songs written by Ron Rogers
Song recordings produced by Roy Thomas Baker
Virgin Records singles